The Maverick Party, formerly known as Wexit Canada, is a Canadian federal political party. It advocates for constitutional changes to benefit, or the independence of, Western Canada, which includes British Columbia, Alberta, Saskatchewan, Manitoba, Yukon, Northwest Territories and Nunavut. The party has its roots in Alberta separatism and advocates the use of grassroots politics.

The party ran candidates across the aforementioned provinces and three territories in the 2021 Canadian federal election, but did not run candidates in ridings where there was a strong possibility of electing a Liberal or New Democratic candidate.

The party was led by former Conservative Party of Canada House leader Jay Hill since the resignation of the party's first leader, Peter Downing. Hill came out of retirement to act as interim leader of the Maverick Party until the election of a new leader. Hill has said that he wants the party to serve a purpose in Western Canada similar to what the Bloc Québécois has done for Quebec.

On May 14, 2022, Maverick party members elected Colin Krieger as the new leader of the party. Krieger won the leadership race with 52 percent of the vote against the only other candidate who was running, Tariq Elnaga.

History 

The Wexit movement gained traction in October 2019, shortly after the 2019 Canadian federal election, when the Liberal Party under Prime Minister Justin Trudeau was re-elected to form government. In August 2019, Wexit Alberta held several meetings including a small summer meeting in Calgary's beltline. A few months later another meeting in Calgary drew about 1700 attendees.

On January 10, 2020, the party became "eligible for registration" under section 387 of the Canada Elections Act. At the time, it recorded with Elections Canada under the name "Wexit Canada". The following day, the party conducted a protest in Edmonton, involving approximately 100 supporters.

In early 2020, Wexit Alberta started purchasing billboards in Alberta criticizing Prime Minister Trudeau for various things such as "ISIS terrorist reintegration", "tax theft", "economic sabotage", "foreign interference" and "ethics violations". This sparked public discussion over the lack of representation in western Canada for some, and criticism of the billboards themselves for others. Signpatico, an advertising agency based in Regina, that installed the billboards, promised to vet ads more carefully in the future stating that while the company "fundamentally stand[s] by freedom of expression, as per the Charter", Signpatico is not "intending on inciting perceptions of hate speech or offensive ads."

In September 2020, Hill announced that the party had changed its name to the "Maverick Party". When the party changed its name, its records with Elections Canada were updated.  It remains eligible for registration when an election is called.

On May 14, 2022 Colin Krieger was elected party leader, succeeding Jay Hill.

Provincial Wexit parties 
While the Wexit movement organized provincial parties to run candidates, the Maverick Party is not directly affiliated with any of these parties. The two main organizers of the #Wexit movement were Peter Downing and Pat King.

Alberta

On January 11, 2020, a Wexit rally was held at the Alberta legislature grounds with the goal of collecting the 8,400 signatures required for official party status.

Wexit reserved the name "Wexit Alberta" with Elections Alberta for use by a provincial party. According to its constitution, its plans included abolishing the provincial branch of the Royal Canadian Mounted Police and the establishment of an "Alberta National Police" and a "Provincial Sheriff Program". It planned to adopt a currency to replace the Canadian dollar as well.

On April 27, 2020, Wexit Alberta and the Freedom Conservative Party of Alberta announced plans to merge into a new party called the Wildrose Independence Party of Alberta. Both parties voted to approve the merger on June 29, 2020. In July 2020, Wildrose Independence Party of Alberta (WIPA) was registered with Elections Alberta, giving effect to the merger. In October 2020, the People's Party of Alberta dissolved and its board members committed support WIPA.

British Columbia
In November 2019, members of a Wexit group held a rally in Prince George. Wexit BC became a registered party with Elections BC in 2020.

Officially, the party ran two candidates in the 2020 British Columbia general election. At the time the election was called, Lee Smith was the party's leader but he resigned shortly after. After final nominations closed, the party announced that it was retracting its endorsements of both of its candidates. As this occurred after the close of nominations, both candidates still appeared on the ballot identified as Wexit BC candidates.

The party's leadership remained vacant as of January 2021.

Saskatchewan

The day after the 2019 federal election, Scott Moe, Premier of Saskatchewan, proposed a "New Deal" with the federal government. He called for an end to the federal carbon tax, renegotiation of the equalization formula, and action on oil-pipeline projects. In the weeks after the election, Wexit volunteers began collecting signatures to form a new party. They called on Moe to hold a referendum on separation, saying that if he did not agree they would form a party to do so.

On March 10, 2020, Wexit Saskatchewan became registered as a provincial party with Elections Saskatchewan. Its first interim leader was Jake Wall. Once registered, Wexit Saskatchewan proposed a referendum on independence in its platform.

On June 3, 2020, the party's executive board voted to change the party's name to Buffalo Party of Saskatchewan. That decision ratified by a membership vote. In July 2020, the party changed its name, and named Wade Sira as its new interim leader.

In the 2020 Saskatchewan general election, the Buffalo Party ran in 17 of the 61 ridings and captured 2.56 percent of the vote.

Party leaders

Policies 
No politician has ever endorsed Western secession while sitting as a Member of Parliament in the House of Commons, and even at the provincial level it is rare for Western Canadian legislators to openly sympathize with separatism (and no MLA has ever won re-election after doing so). The only Western Canadian candidate to ever win election while openly running for a party with a secessionist platform was Gordon Kesler, who won as a Western Canada Concept MLA in a 1982 by-election, and even in that case Kesler downplayed the separatist aspect of his party's platform.

The party is seeking a presence in the House to advance its goals and ensure the frustrations of Western Canadians are heard.

Following the election of Erin O'Toole as the new Conservative Party of Canada leader, Jay Hill was critical, saying that Western Canada would be on the "back burner" under O'Toole's leadership. In September 2020, Hill criticized O'Toole for statements that the Conservatives would ensure Canada meets the Paris Agreement climate change targets.

On April 26, 2022 The party released their policy platform which includes repealing Trudeau’s efforts to block Western economic development such as the ‘No More Pipelines bill’ (C-69) and the ‘Tanker Ban’ (C-48), making major revisions to the equalization formula, institute fiscal responsibility, reduce trade barriers within Canada, increase the exploration and mining of minerals, strengthen provincial autonomy, introduce direct democracy, reform firearms legislation, give greater control of immigration to the provinces, and defund the CBC. While opposing any form of carbon tax, the Maverick Party takes a different approach to dealing with environmental concerns than the Liberals or Conservatives. It does not ignore climate change altogether, but instead advocates for energy options such as nuclear, thermal, biomass, LNG [liquified natural gas] and carbon capture projects to reduce our greenhouse gas emissions in western Canada. These ideas are more realistic  because the technology for producing clean energy using nuclear and liquified natural gas already exists. Both wind energy and solar energy, on the other hand, have severe handicaps such as their unreliability. With existing technology, wind and solar will never be able to replace fossil fuels.

Electoral performance
Popular vote in Canada

See also 

 Cascadia (independence movement)
 Reform Party of Canada
 Western alienation
 Western Block Party
 Western Canada Concept

References

External links 
 

 
2020 establishments in Canada
Conservative parties in Canada
Federal political parties in Canada
Political parties established in 2020
Pro-independence parties
Regionalist parties
Right-wing populism in Canada
Secessionist organizations in Canada